Concordia Preparatory School may refer to one of the following schools:

Concordia Preparatory School (Maryland), formerly Baltimore Lutheran School
Concordia Preparatory School (Utah), formerly Salt Lake Lutheran High School